α-Ketobutyric acid is an organic compound with the formula CH3CH2C(O)CO2H.  It is a colorless solid that melts just above room temperature.  Its conjugate base α-ketobutyrate is the predominant form found in nature (near neutral pH).  It results from the lysis of cystathionine. It is also one of the degradation products of threonine, produced by the catabolism of the amino acid by threonine dehydratase. It is also produced by the degradation of homocysteine and the metabolism of methionine. 

α-Ketobutyrate is transported into the mitochondrial matrix, where it is converted to propionyl-CoA by branched-chain alpha-keto acid dehydrogenase complex. Further mitochondrial reactions produce succinyl-CoA. This is first through the enzyme mitochondria propionyl-CoA carboxylase with biotin as a cofactor to produce (S)-methylmalonyl-CoA. This is subsequently converted to (R)-methylmalonyl-CoA by mitochondrial methylmalonyl-CoA epimerase. Finally, mitochondrial methylmalonyl-CoA mutase with cofactor adenosylcobalamin produces succinyl-CoA which enters the citric acid cycle.

Conversion in sotolon in French vin jaune 
Vin jaune is marked by the formation of sotolon from alpha-ketobutyric acid.

See also 
 Butyric acid
 α-Aminobutyric acid (homoalanine)
 2-Hydroxybutyric acid (α-hydroxybutyric acid)

References

Alpha-keto acids